Carex aureolensis is a tussock-forming species of perennial sedge in the family Cyperaceae. It is native to temperate parts of the Americas from Illinois in the north to northern Argentina in the south.

See also
List of Carex species

References

aureolensis
Plants described in 1855
Taxa named by Ernst Gottlieb von Steudel
Flora of Brazil
Flora of Argentina
Flora of Paraguay
Flora of Uruguay
Flora of Alabama
Flora of Arkansas
Flora of Florida
Flora of Georgia (U.S. state)
Flora of Illinois
Flora of Kansas
Flora of Kentucky
Flora of Louisiana
Flora of Mexico
Flora of Mississippi
Flora of Missouri
Flora of Nebraska
Flora of New Mexico
Flora of North Carolina
Flora of South Carolina
Flora of Oklahoma
Flora of Texas
Flora of Tennessee
Flora of Virginia